Utah Saints is the self-titled debut album by British electronic band Utah Saints. It was released in the United States in 1992 on London Records, and in 1993 the album was released in the United Kingdom on FFRR, featuring a different track listing, cover, and two additional songs. The album reached number 10 on the UK Albums Chart; singles released from this album include "Something Good", "I Want You", and "What Can You Do for Me".

Track listing

1992 U.S. release
 "Something Good" (Jez Willis, Kate Bush)
 "I Want You" (Willis, Jeff Hanneman, Tom Araya)
 "What Can You Do for Me" (Willis, David A. Stewart, Annie Lennox, Gwen Guthrie)
 "Soulution" (Willis)
 "States of Mind" (Willis)
 "New Gold Dream (81-82-83-84)" (Jim Kerr, Charlie Burchill, Derek Forbes, Mick MacNeil)
 "Kinetic Synthetic" (Willis)
 "My Mind Must Be Free" (Ida Reid, Patrick Cowley, Sylvester James, Dave Crawford)
 "Trance Atlantic Glide" (Willis)
 "Too Much to Swallow (Part I)" (Willis)

1993 U.K. release
 "New Gold Dream (81-82-83-84)"
 "What Can You Do for Me"
 "Soulution"
 "Believe in Me"
 "Too Much to Swallow (Part I)"
 "Something Good"
 "I Want You"
 "States of Mind"
 "Trance Atlantic Glide"
 "Kinetic Synthetic"
 "What Can You Do for Me? (1926 Melodic Mix)"
 "My Mind Must Be Free"

Samples
"Something Good" features a sample of Kate Bush's "Cloudbusting"
"I Want You" features a sample of Slayer's "War Ensemble"
"What Can You Do for Me" features samples of Eurythmics' "There Must Be an Angel (Playing with My Heart)", Gwen Guthrie's "Ain't Nothin' Goin' on But the Rent" and KISS' Alive II album
"My Mind Must Be Free" features samples of Candi Staton's "Young Hearts Run Free" and  Sylvester's "Do Ya Wanna Funk?"
"Believe in Me" features samples of The Human League's "Love Action (I Believe in Love)" and Crown Heights Affair's "You Gave Me Love".

Production
Adapted from album liner notes.
Produced by Utah Saints
Mixed by Utah Saints & Guy Hatton
Engineered by Guy Hatton, assisted by Phil Evans
Art direction: Edward ODowd
Design: Johnny Barbis
Photography: Allastair Thain
Computer illustration: Robert Eberhardt

Charts

References

1992 debut albums
Utah Saints albums
London Records albums
FFRR Records albums